Harasztifalu is a village in Vas county, Hungary. Its current Mayor is Vámosné Marksz Mária.

External links 
 Street map (Hungarian)

Populated places in Vas County